Cartigny may refer to several places:

Cartigny, Somme, France
Cartigny-l'Épinay, Calvados, France
Cartigny, Switzerland

See also
Cantigny (disambiguation)
Cartignies, Nord département, France